A storm beach is a beach affected by particularly fierce waves, usually with a very long fetch. The resultant landform is often a very steep beach (up to 45°) composed of rounded cobbles, shingle and occasionally sand. The stones usually have an obvious grading of pebbles, from large to small, with the larger diameter stones typically arrayed at the highest beach elevations. It may also contain many small parts of shipwrecked boats.

Examples
It also connects the Isle of Portland to the mainland at Abbotsbury, west of the resort of Weymouth. Other examples appear in the Shetland and Orkney Islands, as well as the Scottish mainland at Caithness. The beaches of Lakshdweep Islands are also storm beaches.

Gallery

References

Beaches
Erosion landforms